Ender's Game is a 1985 military science fiction novel by American author Orson Scott Card. Set at an unspecified date in Earth's future, the novel presents an imperiled humankind after two conflicts with an insectoid alien species they dub "the buggers". In preparation for an anticipated third invasion, Earth's international military force recruits young children, including the novel's protagonist, Andrew "Ender" Wiggin, to be trained as elite officers. The children learn military strategy and leadership by playing increasingly difficult war games, including some in zero gravity, where Ender's tactical genius is revealed.

The book originated as a short story of the same name, published in the August 1977 issue of Analog Science Fiction and Fact. The novel was published on January 15, 1985. Later, by elaborating on characters and plotlines depicted in the novel, Card wrote additional books in the Ender's Game series. Card released an updated version of Ender's Game in 1991, changing some political facts to account for the then-recent dissolution of the Soviet Union and the end of the Cold War. The novel has been translated into 34 languages.

Reception of the book has been mostly positive. It has become suggested reading for many military organizations, including the United States Marine Corps. Ender's Game was recognized as "best novel" by the 1985 Nebula Award and the 1986 Hugo Award in the genres of science fiction and fantasy. Its four sequels—Speaker for the Dead (1986), Xenocide (1991), Children of the Mind (1996), and Ender in Exile (2008)—follow Ender's subsequent travels to many different worlds in the galaxy. In addition, the later novella A War of Gifts (2007) and novel Ender's Shadow (1999), plus other novels in the Shadow saga, take place during the same time period as the original.

A film adaptation of the same name, written for the screen and directed by Gavin Hood, and starring Asa Butterfield as Ender, was released in October 2013. Card co-produced the film. The novel has also been adapted into two comic book series.

Synopsis 

Humanity has mastered interplanetary spaceflight and they encounter an insect-like alien race called the Formics, and war breaks out. The humans achieve a narrow victory, but fearing future threats of a Formic invasion, create the International Fleet (I.F.) and train gifted children to become commanders at their orbiting Battle School.

Andrew "Ender" Wiggin is born a "Third": a rare exception to Earth's two-child policy, allowed by the government due to the promise shown by his two older siblings. The eldest, Peter, is a highly intelligent sociopath who sadistically bullies Ender. His sister, Valentine, is more sympathetic towards him. The I.F. remove Ender's monitoring device when he is six years old, seemingly ending his chances of Battle School. He is bullied by a fellow student, Stilson, but Ender turns violent and attacks him. Unknown to Ender, Stilson later dies from his wounds. I.F. Colonel Hyrum Graff visits Ender after hearing about the fight. Ender attests that by showing superiority now, he has prevented future struggle. Graff offers him a place in the Battle School.

Once at Battle School, Graff and the other leaders covertly work to keep Ender isolated from the other cadets. Ender finds solace in playing a simulated adventure game that involves killing a giant. The cadets participate in competitive war simulations in zero gravity, where Ender quickly masters the game with novel tactics. To further wear Ender down, he is promoted to command a new army composed of raw recruits, then pitted against multiple armies at once, but Ender's success continues. Ender's jealous ex-commander, Bonzo Madrid, draws him into a fight outside the simulation, and once again seeking to preemptively stop future conflicts Ender uses excessive force, and like Stilson before him Bonzo dies from his injuries. 

Meanwhile on Earth, Peter Wiggin uses a global communication system to post political essays under the pseudonym "Locke", hoping to establish himself as a respected orator and then as a powerful politician. Valentine, despite not trusting Peter, agrees to publish alongside him as "Demosthenes". Their essays are soon taken seriously by the government. Though Graff is told their true identities, he recommends that it be kept a secret, because their writings are politically useful.

Ender, now ten years old, is promoted to Command School. After some preliminary battles in the simulator, he is introduced to Mazer Rackham, a hero from the Formic war who saw key patterns in the Formic behavior. Ender participates in space combat simulations created and controlled by Mazer. As the skirmishes become harder, he is joined by some of his friends from the Battle School as sub-commanders. Despite this, Ender becomes depressed by the battles, his isolation, and by the way Mazer treats him. 

For his final test, under observation by I.F.'s commanders, Ender finds his fleet far outnumbered by Formic ships surrounding their homeworld. Hoping to earn himself expulsion from the school for his ruthlessness, he sacrifices his entire fleet to fire a Molecular Disruption Device at the planet. The Device destroys the planet and the surrounding Formic fleet. He is shocked to hear the I.F. commanders cheering in celebration. Mazer informs Ender that the "simulations" he has been fighting were real battles, directing human spacecraft against Formic fleets via an ansible, and that Ender has won the war. Despite Graff congratulating him, Ender becomes more depressed, realizing that he has committed genocide and become just like his brother.

Ender spends several weeks isolated before recovering. He learns that war has broken out on Earth. Ender and Valentine join a group of space colonists. 

On their new planet, Ender becomes the colony's governor. He discovers a structure that matches the simulation of the giant game from Battle School, and inside finds the dormant egg of a Formic queen. The queen telepathically communicates to Ender that before the first Formic war, they had assumed humans were a non-sentient race, for want of collective consciousness, but realized their mistake too late. Instead, she had reached out to Ender to draw him here and requests that he take the egg to a new planet for the Formics to colonize.

Ender takes the egg and, with information from the queen, writes The Hive Queen under the alias "Speaker for the Dead". Peter, now the leader of Earth and age 77 with a failing heart, recognizes Ender as the author of The Hive Queen. He asks Ender to write a book about him, which Ender titles The Hegemon. The combined works create a new type of funeral, in which the Speaker for the Dead tells the whole and unapologetic story of the deceased, adopted by many on Earth and its colonies. Ender and Valentine leave the colony and travel to many other worlds, looking for a safe place to establish the unborn Hive Queen.

Creation and inspiration 
The original "Ender's Game" is a short story that provides a small snapshot of Ender's experiences in Battle School and Command School; the full-length novel encompasses more of Ender's life before, during, and after the war, and also contains some chapters describing the political exploits of his older siblings back on Earth. In a commentary track for the 20th anniversary audiobook edition of the novel, as well as in the 1991 Author's Definitive Edition, Card stated that Ender's Game was written specifically to establish the character of Ender for his role of the Speaker in Speaker for the Dead, the outline for which he had written before novelizing Ender's Game. In his 1991 introduction to the novel, Card discussed the influence of Isaac Asimov's Foundation series on the novelette and novel. Historian Bruce Catton's work on the American Civil War also influenced Card.

Ender's Game was the first science-fiction novel published entirely online, when it appeared on Delphi a year before print publication.

Critical response 
Ender's Game won the Nebula Award for best novel in 1985, and the Hugo Award for best novel in 1986, considered the two most prestigious awards in science fiction.  Ender's Game was also nominated for a Locus Award in 1986. In 1999, it placed No. 59 on the reader's list of Modern Library 100 Best Novels. It was also honored with a spot on American Library Association's "100 Best Books for Teens".  In 2008, the novel, along with Ender's Shadow, won the Margaret A. Edwards Award, which honors an author and specific works by that author for lifetime contribution to young adult literature. Ender's Game was included in Damien Broderick's book Science Fiction: The 101 Best Novels 1985–2010. It ranked number nine on Locus's top SF novels published before 1990.

The New York Times writer Gerald Jonas asserts that the novel's plot summary resembles a "grade Z, made-for-television, science-fiction rip-off movie", but says that Card develops the elements well despite this "unpromising material". Jonas further praises the development of the character Ender Wiggin: "Alternately likable and insufferable, he is a convincing little Napoleon in short pants."

The novel has received criticism for its realistic portrayal of violence and its justification. Elaine Radford's review, "Ender and Hitler: Sympathy for the Superman", posits that Ender Wiggin is an intentional reference by Card to Adolf Hitler and criticizes the violence in the novel, particularly at the hands of the protagonist. Card responded to Radford's criticisms in Fantasy Review, the same publication. Radford's criticisms are echoed in John Kessel's essay "Creating the Innocent Killer: Ender's Game, Intention, and Morality", wherein Kessel states: "Ender gets to strike out at his enemies and still remain morally clean. Nothing is his fault." Noah Berlatsky makes similar claims in his analysis of the relationship between colonization and science fiction, where he describes Ender's Game as in part a justification of "Western expansion and genocide".

The U.S. Marine Corps Professional Reading List makes the novel recommended reading at several lower ranks, and again at Officer Candidate/Midshipman.
The book was placed on the reading list by Captain John F. Schmitt, author of FMFM-1 (Fleet Marine Force Manual, on maneuver doctrine) for "provid[ing] useful allegories to explain why militaries do what they do in a particularly effective shorthand way".
In introducing the novel for use in leadership training, Marine Corps University's Lejeune program opines that it offers "lessons in training methodology, leadership, and ethics as well. . . . Ender's Game has been a stalwart item on the Marine Corps Reading List since its inception". It is also used as an early fictional example of game-based learning.

Accolades 

The weeks ending June 9, August 11, September 1, September 8, October 27, November 3, November 10, and November 24, 2013, the novel was No. 1 on The New York Times''' Best Sellers List of Paperback Mass-Market Fiction.

 Revisions 
In 1991, Card made several minor changes to reflect the political climates of the time, including the decline of the Soviet Union. In the afterword of Ender in Exile (2008), Card stated that many of the details in chapter 15 of Ender's Game were modified for use in the subsequent novels and short stories.  In order to more closely match the other material, Card has rewritten chapter 15 and plans to offer a revised edition of the book.

 Adaptations 

 Film 

After several years of speculation on the possibility, Summit Entertainment financed and coordinated the development of a film in 2011, serving as its distributor. Gavin Hood directed the film, which lasts 1 hour and 54 minutes. Filming began in New Orleans, Louisiana, on February 27, 2012, and was released on November 1, 2013 (USA). A movie preview trailer was released in May 2013 and a second trailer was released later that year.

Card has called Ender's Game "unfilmable", "because everything takes place in Ender's head", and refused to sign a film deal unless he could ensure that the film was "true to the story". Of the film that he eventually agreed to, Card said it was "the best that good people could do with a story they really cared about and believed in", and while warning fans not to expect a completely faithful adaptation, called the film "damn good".

The movie starred Asa Butterfield as Ender Wiggin and Harrison Ford as Colonel Hyrum Graff. It grossed $125 million worldwide, and received mixed reviews from critics.

 Video game 
In 2008 it was announced an Ender's Game video game was in the works. It was to be known as Ender's Game: Battle Room and was a planned digitally distributed video game for all viable downloadable platforms. It was under development by Chair Entertainment, which also developed the Xbox Live Arcade games Undertow and Shadow Complex. Chair had sold the licensing of Empire to Card, which became a bestselling novel. Little was revealed about the game, save its setting in the Ender universe and that it would have focused on the Battle Room.

In December 2010, it was announced that the video game development had stopped and the project put on indefinite hold.

Orson Scott Card and Amaze Entertainment also came to an agreement regarding a video game adaption of the novel but nothing ever materialized.

 Comics 

Marvel Comics and Orson Scott Card announced on April 19, 2008, that they would be publishing a limited series adaptation of Ender's Game as the first in a comic series that would adapt all of Card's Ender's Game novels.  Card was quoted as saying that it is the first step in moving the story to a visual medium. The first five-issue series, titled Ender's Game: Battle School, was written by Christopher Yost, while the second five-issue series, Ender's Shadow: Battle School, was written by Mike Carey.

 Audioplay Ender's Game Alive: The Full Cast Audioplay, is an 2013 audio drama written by Orson Scott Card, based on the Ender's Game novel. At over seven hours in length, this retelling of Ender's Game hints at storylines from "Teacher's Pest", "The Polish Boy", "The Gold Bug", Ender's Shadow, Shadow of the Hegemon, Shadow of the Giant, Shadows in Flight, Earth Unaware, and Speaker for the Dead, and gives new insight into the beginnings of Ender's philotic connection with the Hive Queen. Ender's Game Alive is directed by Gabrielle de Cuir, produced by Stefan Rudnicki at Skyboat Media, published by Audible.com, and performed by a cast of over 30 voice actors playing over 100 roles.

Audible also commissioned a German-language adaptation of the same script. Titled Ender's Game/Das grosse Spiel - Das ungekürzte Hörspiel ("The unabridged audio drama"), this adaptation was produced by "Lauscherlounge", directed by Balthasar von Weymarn and performed by a cast of 100 different voice actors including children.

 Translations Ender's Game has been translated into 34 languages:

  ("Ender's Game").
  ("Ender's Game").
  ("Ender's Game"), 2000.
  (pinyin：Ān dé de yóu xì) ("Ender's Game"), 2003.
  ("Ender's Game"), 2007.
  ("Ender's Game"), 1994.
  ("Ender's Strategy"), 1990.
  ("Ender Wins", "The Tactics of Ender"), 1989, 1994 (two editions)
  ("Ender's Game"), 2000.
  ("Ender"), 1990.
  ("The Ender Strategy"), 1996, 1999, 2000, 2001.
  ("Ender's Game"), 2011
  (enderis TamaSi) ("Ender's Game"), 2015.
  ("The Great Game"), 1986, 2005.
  (Tǒ pehníthi too Ender) ("Ender's Game"), 1996.
  (Ha-Misḥaq šel Ender) ("Ender's Game"), 1994.
  ("Endgame"), 1991.
  ("Ender's Game").
  (Endā no Gēmu) ("Ender's Game"), 1987.
  (Endaŭi Geim) ("Ender's Game"), 1992, 2000 (two editions).
  ("Ender's Game"), 2008.
  ("Ender's Game"), 2007
  ("Ender's Game"), 1999.
  (Bazi ē Ender), 2011
  ("Ender's Game"), 1994.
  ("The Game of the Exterminator") (Brazil).
  ("The Final Game") (Portugal).
  ("Ender's Game").
  (Igra Endera) ("Ender's Game"), 1995, 1996, 2002, 2003 (two editions).
  ("Ender's Game"), 2010.
  (Enderova igra'') ("Ender's Game"), 1988.
  ("Ender's Game").
  ("Ender's Game"), 1991, 1998.
  ("The Game that Changed the World"), 2007.
  ("Ender's Game").
  ("Ender's Game"), 2013.
  ("Ender's Game"), 2014.

See also 
 List of Ender's Game characters
 Formics

Notes

External links 

 About the novel Ender's Game from Card's website
 Ender's Game at Macmillan
 
 Ender's Game. Mormon Literature & Creative Arts Database.
 Intergalactic Medicine Show: Online science fiction magazine published by Orson Scott Card. Features a new Ender's world story in every issue.

1985 science fiction novels
American young adult novels
1985 American novels
Novels set in the 22nd century
433 Eros
American novels adapted into films
Science fiction novels adapted into films
Ender's Game series books
Hugo Award for Best Novel-winning works
Military science fiction novels
Fiction about near-Earth asteroids
Nebula Award for Best Novel-winning works
Tor Books books
Works about child soldiers
Works based on short fiction
Works originally published in Analog Science Fiction and Fact
Fictional video games
Genocide in fiction
Fiction about space warfare